Església de Sant Romà dels Vilars  is a church located in Els Vilars, Escaldes-Engordany Parish, Andorra. It is a heritage property registered in the Cultural Heritage of Andorra. It was built in the 10th century.

References

Escaldes-Engordany
Roman Catholic churches in Andorra
Cultural Heritage of Andorra